Babarpur Ajitmal is a city with the status of "Nagar Panchayat" of district Auraiya, Uttar Pradesh, India.

Demographics
 India census  Babarpur Ajitmal had a population of 50,550. Males constitute 53% of the population and females 47%.
Babarpur Ajitmal has an average literacy rate of 69%, higher than the national average of 59.5%;
with 58% of the males and 42% of females literate. 16% of the population is under 6 years of age.

See also
Muradganj

References

External links
 https://web.archive.org/web/20120402102854/http://www.jmvajitmal.ac.in/Index.htm
 https://auraiya.nic.in/tehsil/

Cities and towns in Auraiya district